Johanna Wolf (1841-floruit 1889), was an Austrian-Hungarian brothel owner, procurer and madam. She owned and operated a successful high class brothel in Vienna from 1865 onward. She has been the subject of fiction.

Among her clients were Rudolf, Crown Prince of Austria and Wilhelm II, German Emperor. She is known to have acted as a messenger and a spy for Rudolf through her connections. Wolf was involved in the Mayerling Incident. Mizzi Kaspar was among her employees.

References
 Brigitte Hamann: Kronprinz Rudolf. Ein Leben. Piper

1841 births
Austrian brothel owners and madams
Year of death missing
19th-century Austrian businesspeople